Edwin S. Quick (December 1881 - June 19, 1913) was a Major League Baseball pitcher who played in 1903 with the New York Highlanders. He threw right-handed.

Quick started his professional baseball career in 1902 in the Pacific Northwest League. Late in the following season, he made one appearance for the Highlanders; he pitched two innings and gave up five runs. In January 1904, he was traded to Toledo. He went 18-18 for the Western League's Omaha Rourkes in 1905. Quick finished his career pitching in the Pacific Coast League in 1907 and 1908.

Quick was born in Baltimore, Maryland. He died in Rocky Ford, Colorado in 1913, of pneumonia.

References

External links

1881 births
1913 deaths
Major League Baseball pitchers
New York Highlanders players
Spokane Smoke Eaters players
Portland Green Gages players
Salt Lake City Elders players
Omaha Rangers players
Omaha Rourkes players
Little Rock Travelers players
San Francisco Seals (baseball) players
Oakland Oaks (baseball) players
Baseball players from Baltimore
People from Rocky Ford, Colorado